William Quincy Davis (born July 2, 1968) is a Democratic member of the Illinois House of Representatives, representing the 30th District since January 8, 2003. He is a member of the Illinois House Legislative Black Caucus.

Early life and education
Davis was born on July 2, 1968, in Harvey, Illinois. He graduated from Southern Illinois University Carbondale in 1989, earning a Bachelor of Arts Degree Political Science in three years. In 2009, Davis completed his Master of Public Administration Degree at Governors State University. He is a member of Kappa Alpha Psi fraternity and a founding member of the Better Funding for Better Schools Coalition.

Political career
Davis began serving in the Illinois House of Representatives on January 8, 2003.  He is the Chair of the Health and Healthcare Disparities committee and Vice-Chairman of the Appropriations Elementary and Secondary Education committee. He also serves on the International Trade and Commerce, Labor, and Railroad Safety committees.

In 2005, Davis worked on legislation to increase access to quality and affordable health care for children, regardless of income. He also helped create the Illinois Cares Rx program, filling the gap in Medicare Part D coverage and ensuring that Illinois' senior citizens and disabled persons receive the best coverage possible under the federal plan.

Davis also supported House Bill 750, which would increase the education foundation level by $1,000 per pupil. This while providing $2.4 billion in property tax relief statewide.

In 2007 he sponsored legislation that would require Illinois public schools to begin each day with a moment of silence. The controversial bill passed the Illinois General Assembly but was vetoed by the Governor Blagojevich. Both Houses of the General Assembly voted to override the governor's veto and the bill became Illinois law.

On July 31, 2017 Davis was appointed a member of the Trade Policy Task Force for a term ending December 31, 2018. The Trade Policy Task Force's function is to analyze important issues relative to the growth of international trade and make recommendations to Congress, the United States Trade Representative, and the White House National Trade Council regarding trade policy. The Task Force also promotes Illinois as a market for exporting and importing.

As of July 3, 2022, Representative Davis is a member of the following Illinois House committees:

 (Chairman of) Appropriations - Elementary & Secondary Education Committee (HAPE)
 Appropriations - Public Safety (HAPP)
 Energy & Environment Committee (HENG)
 Executive Committee (HEXC)
 International Trade & Commerce (HITC)
 Labor & Commerce Committee (HLBR)
 Minority Impact Analysis Subcommittee (HLBR-MIAS)

Electoral history

References

External links
Representative William Davis (D) 30th District
98th, 97th, 96th, 95th, 94th, 93rd, 
 
William Davis at Illinois House Democrats

Democratic Party members of the Illinois House of Representatives
1968 births
Living people
Southern Illinois University alumni
Governors State University alumni
African-American state legislators in Illinois
People from Harvey, Illinois
21st-century American politicians
21st-century African-American politicians
20th-century African-American people